Allura may refer to:
 Allura, Karnataka, a village in Bidar district, Karnata, India
 Apache Allura, software
 Princess Allura, a fictional character
 Allura Red AC, a dye

See also 
 Alura (disambiguation)
 Allure (disambiguation)